Mark Slobin is an American scholar and ethnomusicologist who has written extensively on the subject of East European Jewish music and klezmer music, as well as the music of Afghanistan, where he conducted research beginning in 1967.  He is Winslow-Kaplan Professor of Music Emeritus at Wesleyan University, where he taught both music and American Studies from 1971 to 2016.

He has been the president of the Society for Ethnomusicology and the Society for Asian Music. Two of his books on Jewish music have won the ASCAP-Deems Taylor Award.

In 1981 and 2001, he edited and reissued collections of the Ukrainian Jewish ethnomusicologist Moses Beregovsky.

Published works
 Subcultural Sounds: Micromusics of the West
 Chosen Voices: The Story of the American Cantorate
 Tenement Songs: The Popular Music of the Jewish Immigrants
 Fiddler on the Move : Exploring the Klezmer World
 American Klezmer : Its roots and offshoots
 Old Jewish Folk Music: The Collections and Writings of Moshe Beregovski
 Global Soundtracks : Worlds of film music (ed.)
 Music in the Culture of Northern Afghanistan. Tucson: Univ. of Arizona Press. (1976)

Documentary 
 1981 "Number 7: They All Know It," video, as project supervisor, script co-writer.
 1983 "Music in the Afghan North," video
 1986 "More than a Singer," project director, script consultant
 2003 Afghanistan Untouched, 2-cd set of field recordings, Traditional Crossroads.

Further reading
Marcello Sorce Keller, “Mark Slobin”, in Musik in Geschichte und Gegenwart. Personenteil XV. Kassel: Bärenreiter, 2006, 914–915.

References

External links 
 "Slobin’s Afghanistan Music Recordings, Field Notes Archived Online"
 "The Mark Slobin Fieldwork Archive: Music in the Afghan North, 1967-1972"

External links
 An Interview on Klezmershack with Slobin on Klezmer Music and musicologist Moshe Beregovskii.

Year of birth missing (living people)
Living people
Wesleyan University faculty